The Machu Picchu arboreal chinchilla rat (Cuscomys oblativus) is a large species of South American chinchilla rats, known from skeletal remains found by members of the Peruvian Expedition of 1912. The animals were buried alongside people in ancient Inca tombs at Machu Picchu in Peru. It was considered extinct by the IUCN in 2008, but conservation status was changed to data deficient in 2016. Photos of a rodent taken at Machu Picchu in late 2009 likely show this species, a finding apparently confirmed in 2014.

In 2020, as part of biodiversity study, a report was released with images that captured the rodent in the surroundings of Machu Picchu sanctuary.  

Originally assigned to the genus Abrocoma, recent studies showed it to be more closely allied to Cuscomys ashaninka, a species unknown to science until 1999.

References

Further reading
 
 Giant Furry Pets Of The Incas

Cuscomys
Mammals described in 1916
Taxobox binomials not recognized by IUCN